Martina McCarthy (born 27 October 1981) is an Irish sprinter. She competed in the women's 4 × 400 metres relay at the 2000 Summer Olympics.

References

External links
 

1981 births
Living people
Athletes (track and field) at the 2000 Summer Olympics
Irish female sprinters
Olympic athletes of Ireland
Place of birth missing (living people)
Olympic female sprinters